ASB.tv, or Air Show Buzz was a media company dedicated to the “Aerotainment” or entertainment and news in the aviation and air show industry.

History
Air Show Buzz was founded in 2006 by Ed Shipley, Jim Beasley, retired USAF General Hal Hornburg, Stephanie Ross-Simon, and Deb Mitchell. Dan Friedkin joined the group in 2008. The group started as www.airshowbuzz.com and evolved into ASB.tv, as the company focused on video production and film production.   The company plays an active role in many of the World's top air shows including Jones Beach New York Air Show, Flying Legends, Duxford England, Aviation Nation, Nellis AFB, Rhode Island Air National Guard, Wings Over Houston Air Show, Texas, Thunder Over the Boardwalk, Atlantic City, New Jersey by flying as The Horsemen Aerobatic Team and recording event footage.  It exists today as one of the only dedicated aviation production company that owns World War II combat planes used for filming. The Air Show Buzz website and community was closed in mid-2012.

Video production 
Air Show Buzz films and distributes aviation related content in full 1080p.  Discovery Channel, Lucasfilm and other mainstream media networks have utilized its content across their productions around aviation and the warbirds of World War II.

Online and offline components 
Currently, Air Show Buzz retains one of the largest aviation repositories of consumer-generated images and videos online. As of July 22, 2009 there were a total of 18,400 aviation photos and 3,600 aviation videos. With an active user base of more than 17,000 contributing members, the user base is among the largest in the industry.

Glacier Girl 
On June 22, 2007 www.asb.tv was part of the team documenting the attempted completion of a 1942 mission by a P-38 from the “Lost Squadron.” The P-38 was “Glacier Girl” recovered from the Greenland icecap ten years earlier. 
A mechanical problem with the P-38 forced the team to abandon its mission similar to the original team who in 1942 made an emergency landing on the ice because of foul weather. 
Ed Shipley, flying P-51 Mustang, “Miss Velma” continued the journey making the transatlantic crossing alone, in a single engine airplane. People could track the progress of the flight live on www.airshowbuzz.com and watched video clips and photos throughout the journey.

Closing 
Air Show Buzz's website and online community was discontinued in mid-2012. 
A statement from their website said:

"AIRSHOWBUZZ HAS FLOWN WEST

When we launched ASB 5 years ago it quickly became the premier online community for the air show industry. During that time, we have met countless friends from around the world who share our passion for aviation.

While it has been an amazing experience, we ultimately realize our true passion lies in our involvement with the live air show community and doing what we love most, flying. Because of this, we will be closing ASB effective immediately. Moving forward, we will put all our energy towards being part of the wonderful group of family and friends at the live events across the country.

We want to thank all of you for being a part of this great experience and we look forward to seeing you at an air show very soon."

References

External links
WWII warbird to finish aborted 1942 mission
Plane Freed From a Glacier Sets Out for Britain Again
Glacier Girl Will Fly Again
Glacier Girl

Mass media companies established in 2006
Mass media companies disestablished in 2012
Defunct mass media companies of the United States